Hyung-min, also spelled Hyeong-min, is a Korean male given name. Its meaning differs based on the hanja used to write each syllable of the name. There are 21 hanja with the reading "hyung" and 27 hanja with the reading "min" on the South Korean government's official list of hanja which may be registered for use in given names.

People with this name include:
Chung Hyung-min (born 1964), South Korean biotechnology professor
Lee Hyung-min (born 1969), South Korean film director
Joseph Hyungmin Son (born 1970), South Korean-born American mixed martial artist
Han Hyeong-min (born 1971), South Korean boxer
Shin Hyung-min (born 1986), South Korean footballer
Choe Hyeong-min (born 1990), South Korean cyclist

See also
List of Korean given names

References

Korean masculine given names